Luca Campani (born February 18, 1990) is an Italian professional basketball player for Pallacanestro Trieste of the Italian Lega Basket Serie A (LBA).

Career
On July 12, 2018, Campani signed with the Italian club Sidigas Avellino. He signed with Basket Torino in 2019.

Campani returned to the Serie A on January 16, 2022 signing with Pallacanestro Trieste to replace the injured Alessandro Lever.

References

External links 
Eurobasket.com Profile
Legabasket Profile

1990 births
Living people
Centers (basketball)
Fulgor Libertas Forlì players
Basket Torino players
Italian men's basketball players
Lega Basket Serie A players
Pallacanestro Reggiana players
Pallacanestro Varese players
Orlandina Basket players
Power forwards (basketball)
S.S. Felice Scandone players
Sutor Basket Montegranaro players
Vanoli Cremona players
Sportspeople from Reggio Emilia